La Gente (Spanish for "The People") is a bilingual student newsmagazine published, circulated, and run at the University of California, Los Angeles. It is the longest continuous running publication of its kind.

History and profile
La Gente de Aztlan was started by Chicano students in 1971. First published on February 16, 1971, during the height of the Chicano Movement La Gente has survived severe budget cuts as well as anti-multicultural sentiment during the early and mid 1990s. The magazine deals with politics, art, education, pedagogy, health, and other issues concerning the Chicano, Latino, and Native American communities. It is published three times during the academic year.

In 1996 the magazine had a circulation of 20,000, copies with a collective readership of over 60,000 people. Today the magazine publishes between 5,000 and 10,000 copies with a readership of nearly 20,000. La Gente was adversely affected by statewide budget cuts and must now rely on outside funding.

Although La Gente targets the 15–26-year-old population of Los Angeles, it has effectively reached people from various age groups and backgrounds. La Gente is distributed to high schools, community organizations, panaderias, carnicerias, and tienditas throughout Los Angeles. In addition, it is distributed to selected correctional facilities, colleges, and universities across the southwest.

References

External links
UCLA Student Media 

Lagente.org 

Gente de Aztlan Records, La 

Political magazines published in the United States
Quarterly magazines published in the United States
Student magazines published in the United States
Magazines established in 1971
Magazines published in Los Angeles
Spanish-language magazines
Spanish-language mass media in California
Triannual magazines published in the United States